The loosestrife borer (Papaipema lysimachiae) is a moth of the family Noctuidae. It is found from New Brunswick to Georgia, west to Illinois, north to Wisconsin and Ontario.

The wingspan is 28–35 mm. Adults are on wing from August to October.

The larvae bore the stems and roots of Lysimachia quadrifolia.

External links
Bug Guide
Images

Papaipema
Moths of North America